The Martin Cheairs House is a historic mansion in Spring Hill, Tennessee, USA.

History
The mansion was built in the 1850s for Martin Cheairs, whose brother lived at the Rippavilla Plantation. Both mansions were designed in the Greek Revival architectural style.

During the American Civil War, General Earl Van Dorn of the Confederate States Army used the mansion as his headquarters (after he had left White Hall). He was murdered in the house in 1863.

Union Major General David S. Stanley used this house as his headquarters on the night of November 29, 1864, as his Fourth Army Corps pressed north, toward Franklin, Tennessee.

Architectural significance
It has been listed on the National Register of Historic Places since December 12, 1976.

References

Houses on the National Register of Historic Places in Tennessee
Greek Revival houses in Tennessee
Houses completed in 1851
Houses in Maury County, Tennessee
National Register of Historic Places in Maury County, Tennessee